The 1967–68 Bradford City A.F.C. season was the 55th in the club's history.

The club finished 5th in Division Four, reached the 2nd round of the FA Cup, and the 1st round of the League Cup.

Sources

References

Bradford City A.F.C. seasons
Bradford City